Michael James Horan, AM (born 1 July 1944) is a former Australian politician who represented the seat of Toowoomba South in the Legislative Assembly of Queensland from 18 May 1991 to 24 March 2012. Originally he was a member of the National Party of Australia, but follow its merger he is now a member of the Liberal National Party of Queensland until his retirement.

Early life
Prior to entering parliament, Horan was employed as the General Manager of the Royal Agricultural Society of Queensland and General Manager of the Toowoomba Greyhound Racing Club.

Political career
Horan entered politics at the 1991 Toowoomba South by-election. He replaced property developer and Toowoomba Mayor Clive Berghofer, who had previously held the seat for the National Party until the state's electoral laws were amended to prevent simultaneous service in state parliamentary and local government authority positions.

Government Minister (1996–98)
Horan served as Health Minister in the Borbidge Government 1996–98, and as Deputy Nationals leader between 1998 and 1999.

Opposition Leader (2001–03) 
Horan was made leader of the National Party and Opposition on 2 March 2001 until  after Rob Borbidge's retirement from politics. He defeated his successor as deputy leader Lawrence Springborg by 6 votes to 5 with Borbidge not voting.

He was replaced as leader by Springborg on 4 February 2003 after he failed to gain ground on Peter Beattie.

Horan became the first leader of his party who did not become Premier since Ted Maher (served 1936-41 when the party was then called the Country Party).

Post Leadership (2003–12) 
He became a member of the Liberal National Party of Queensland in 2008 and served in the Queensland Parliament as Shadow Attorney-General, Shadow Minister for Justice and Racing, Shadow Minister for Open Government between 30 September 2008 and 5 April 2009. On 6 April 2009, he was appointed to the position of Opposition Whip.

Horan stood down at the 2012 state election.

Personal life
Horan captained the Australian Universities rugby union team, and played for the Parramatta Eels rugby league team in Sydney from 1968 to 1970, before moving to Gympie, Queensland to run a dairy farm.

Horan is married with two sons and a daughter. His son, Tim Horan, is a former Australian rugby union footballer.

References

1944 births
Living people
National Party of Australia members of the Parliament of Queensland
Liberal National Party of Queensland politicians
Members of the Queensland Legislative Assembly
Members of the Order of Australia
People from Toowoomba
Leaders of the Opposition in Queensland
Australian sportsperson-politicians
21st-century Australian politicians